Medaille University is a private university in Buffalo, New York. The Sisters of St. Joseph founded Medaille in 1937, naming it after their founder, Jean Paul Médaille. Today, it is nonsectarian and coeducational. The university serves roughly 1,600 students from Western New York and Southern Ontario.

History 
The Sisters of St. Joseph established the tradition that led to Medaille University in 1875, when they opened the Institute of the Sisters of Saint Joseph, a training center for nuns and other vowed women who wanted to serve the church in education. 

They started offering degrees in education in 1937. At that time, the school's name was Mount Saint Joseph Teachers' College. In 1964, it became Mount Saint Joseph College and in 1968, Medaille College.

Most graduates went on to teach at Catholic schools in New York State.

Campuses

Medaille's main campus is in Buffalo, New York. It is within the Olmsted Crescent, a historic area of parkways and landscape designed by Frederick Law Olmsted.

Medaille also has a branch campus in Rochester. This campus offers undergraduate degrees for adult students in business administration, and graduate degrees in business administration and organizational leadership, as well as mental health counseling.

Athletics

Medaille is a charter member of the Allegheny Mountain Collegiate Conference, as an NCAA Division III school.

The women's basketball team won the AMCC championships in 2005–06, 2006–07, 2007–08 and 2009–2010; the men's soccer team won the AMCC championships in 2005, 2006, 2007, 2008, 2009 and 2010. In 2010, The men's soccer team also reached the sweet 16, the furthest any Medaille Sports team has ever advanced; also, in 2010, The Medaille Men's Soccer undefeated streak in the AMCC of five years was snapped. On September 25, 2010, the Franciscan University Barons pulled off the biggest upset in history, winning the match 2–1, and the baseball team won the AMCC championship in 2007.

Notable alumni
Robby Takac – American musician (bass guitarist and vocalist); founding member of the Goo Goo Dolls
Kendell McFayden – American professional soccer player with Kitsap Pumas and Rochester Rhinos
Gary Boughton – American professional soccer player with F.C. New York & Rochester Lancers
Adam Page – American paralympic (sled hockey)

Notable faculty
Richard Jacob, Professor of Psychology and Sport Studies (1995–present); former Head Coach in the American Basketball Association
Ethan Paquin, Associate Professor of Humanities (2004–2010); Editor-In-Chief, Slope Editions

Conflict concerning academic freedom 
In 2002, President John J. Donohue fired a professor (Therese Dillon Warden) with tenure, subjected another (Uhuru Watson) to suspension, and punished two non-tenured professors for allegedly passing around confidential minutes from meetings held by the committee charged with promotion and granting tenure appointments. They were forbidden to enter the campus district. Many colleagues protested the disciplinary action as a violation of academic freedom. Kenneth Weshues stated that "Dozens, perhaps hundreds, of individuals at the college have been harmed" due to a "social ill that has laid the college low."

References

External links
 
 Official athletics website

Education in Buffalo, New York
Educational institutions established in 1937
Private universities and colleges in New York (state)
Universities and colleges in Erie County, New York
1937 establishments in New York (state)
Sisters of Saint Joseph colleges and universities